The following is a timeline of the history of the city of Qom, Iran.

Prior to 20th century

 685 - Arab Shia refugees settle in Qom.
 804/805 - Qom gains "administrative independence from Isfahan."
 816 - Death of Fātimah bint Mūsā (sister of 8th Imam of Twelver Shia faith); shrine develops thereafter.
 825 - Qom "attacked."
 988 - Hasan ibn Muhammad Qumi writes Tarikh-i Qum (city history).
 1034 - Hassan-i Sabbah born in Qom (approximate date).
 1224 - City besieged by Mongol forces.
 1393 - Timur in power.
 1442 - City becomes seat of government of Timurid monarch Sultan Muhammad bin Baysonqor.
 1447/1448 - City sacked by Qara Qoyunlu forces.
 1469 - Ağ Qoyunlu in power.
 1501 - Twelver Shia Islam declared official state religion in Iran, a development beneficial to Qom as a holy city (approximate date).
 1722 - Qom sacked by Afghans.
 1883 - "New court" built at the Fatima shrine.

20th century

 1920 - Population: 30,000-40,000 (approximate estimate).
 1922 - Qom Seminary (hawza) established.
 1923 - Printing press in operation.
 1950 - Population: 83,235 (estimate).
 1960 - Population: 105,272 (estimate).
 1963
 Mar'ashi Najafi library established.
 Religious leader Khumayni arrested and exiled.
 1966 - Population: 134,292.
 1974 - Mohemmat Sazi Football Club formed.
 1975 - "Riots involving 'Muslim Marxists.'"
 1976 - Population: 246,831.
 1978 - 7–9 January: Iranian Revolution against Pahlavis begins in Qom.
 1982 - Population: 424,000 (estimate).
 1996
 Center for the Revival of Islamic Heritage established.
 Population: 777,677.
 1999 - February: Local election held.

21st century

 2008 - Yadegar-e Emam Stadium opens.
 2009
 December: Funeral of religious leader Hussein-Ali Montazeri.
 Qom Monorail construction begins.
 2011 - Population: 1,074,036.
 2013 - 14 June: Local election held.
 2014 - City becomes part of newly formed national administrative Region 1.
 2020 - 19 February: The first two cases of COVID-19 were detected in Iran.

See also
 Qom history
 
 Category:Monuments in Qom (in Persian)
 Timelines of other cities in Iran: Bandar Abbas, Hamadan, Isfahan, Kerman, Mashhad, Shiraz, Tabriz, Tehran, Yazd

References

This article incorporates information from the Persian Wikipedia.

Bibliography

in English
 
 
 
 
 
  via Google Books
 
  
 
  (About city history written in 10th century)
 
  (Includes bibliography)

in other languages
  (Includes information about Qom)
  (Written in 10th century in Arabic)
  
 
  
 M. Tabataba’i. Turbat-i Pākān [Monuments and buildings of Qom], 2 vols (Qom, 1976)

External links

  (Bibliography)
 Items related to Qom, various dates (via Qatar Digital Library)
 
 
 Items related to Qom, various dates (via Europeana)
 Items related to Qom, various dates (via Digital Public Library of America)

Years in Iran
Qom
Qom